Sigi Regency is a regency of Central Sulawesi, Indonesia. It lies upstream on the Palu River, and immediately south of Palu city, the provincial capital. It covers an area of 5,196.02 km2 and had a population of 215,030 at the 2010 Census and 239,421 at the 2020 Census; the official estimate as at mid 2021 was 261,676. The principal town lies at Sigi Biromaru.

Sigi Regency was one of the areas in northwest Sulawesi most affected by the 2018 earthquake and tsunami in Sulawesi.  Dozens of people were reported to have been killed by the earthquake and there were reports of "massive liquification" which caused homes to be swept away.

Conflicts

Following religious conflicts in the neighbouring Poso Regency, the Indonesia government mounted Operation Tinombala in early 2016 to combat local terrorist activities carried out by the East Indonesia Mujahiddin (Mujahiddin Indonesian Timur, or MIT) in the province.  In late November 2020, there were indications that the conflict had spread into Sigi Regency when four residents of remote Lembantongoa village were killed in an apparent terrorist attack attributed to MIT.  Indonesia's senior Coordinating Political, Legal and Security Minister Mahfud MD issued a statement saying that the government was committed to tracking down those responsible for the murders and the accompanying destruction.

Administrative Districts 
The Sigi Regency was divided at 2010 into fifteen districts (kecamatan), tabulated below with their areas and their populations at the 2010 Census  and 2020 Census, together with the official estimates as at mid 2021.

References

Regencies of Central Sulawesi